Kashan is a city in Isfahan Province, Iran.

Kashan may also refer to:

Qashan, a historical city in Volga Bulgaria and Khanate of Kazan
Kashan, alternate name of Jaleq, a city in Sistan and Baluchestan Province, Iran
Kashan, Alborz, a village in Alborz Province, Iran
Kashan, East Azerbaijan, a village in East Azerbaijan Province, Iran
Kashan, Hormozgan, a village in Hormozgan Province, Iran
Kashan, Khuzestan, a village in Khuzestan Provinve, Iran
Kashan County, an administrative subdivision of Isfahan Province, Iran
Kashan (Peru), a mountain in Peru